Zoho Music is a Latin jazz independent record label based in New York, founded by Joachim Becker in 2003. In 2005, the label expanded to blues, R&B, Southern and classic rock on the Zoho Roots imprint. The catalog consists of over 180 CD releases, which includes three Grammy Award-winning albums and three Latin Grammy Award-winning albums.

History 
German-born Joachim Becker moved to the United States in 1980, eventually settling in Millwood, New York in 1986. In 2000, Becker co-founded the label Khaeon, which lasted for three years before it was folded. In September 2003, Becker founded Zoho Music, bringing some artists from Khaeon. His first signing was American jazz bassist Harvie S. The last album by Puerto Rican percussionist and bandleader Ray Barretto, was posthumously on Zoho Music before his death in 2006.

In 2005, the label received its first Recording Academy award, a Latin Grammy award for Best Tango Album, awarded to Bajo Cero by Argentine pianist Pablo Ziegler. Since then two more released have won awards, Leo Brouwer's The String Quartets/String Trio for Best Classical Album in 2010, and Arturo O'Farrill's Final Night at Birdland for Best Instrumental Album in 2014.

In 2007, blues musician Ike Turner won a Grammy Award for Best Traditional Blues Album for his Zoho Roots release Risin' with the Blues. Arturo O'Farrill won a Grammy for Best Latin Jazz Album in 2009 for his album Song for Chico. Pablo Ziegler's album Jazz Tango won for Best Latin Jazz Album in 2018.

Roster 
Artists on Zoho Music have included:

 Ray Barretto
 Bobby Sanabria
 Carlos Barbosa-Lima
 Arturo O'Farrill
 Pablo Ziegler
 Hendrik Meurkens
 Duduka Da Fonseca
 Trio Da Paz
 Hector Martignon
 Leo Brouwer
 Harvie S
Vic Juris
Judi Silvano
Edsel Gomez

Artists on Zoho Roots have included:

 Ike Turner
 Bonnie Bramlett
 Jimmy Hall
The Pretty Things
 Walter "Wolfman" Washington
 The Amazing World Of Arthur Brown
 The Brothers of the Southland
 The Persuasions
Swamp Cabbage
Jay Willie Blues Band

References

External links 

 Official website

American independent record labels
Companies based in New York (state)
Record labels established in 2003
Latin American music record labels
Blues record labels
Jazz record labels
Rock record labels
Rhythm and blues record labels